Ventura County Medical Center is a hospital in the city of Ventura, California, United States.  It is a Level II Trauma Center with 274 bed acute care hospital. The county also operates a 49-bed campus in Santa Paula. As a teaching hospital, affiliated with University of California, Los Angeles, it was recognized as the best family-medicine residency program in the United States in 2014.

A 220,000 square-foot state-of-the-art replacement wing is currently under construction to meet California's updated seismic regulations, and is scheduled its completion mid 2017. replacing older facilities built in 1923 and 1953.

Services
Ventura County Medical Center is a full-service acute care hospital with a 24-hour emergency center. Along with intensive care and definitive observation units, it also houses specialty care units such as medical/ surgical, telemetry and oncology, pediatric, and neonatal.

In November 2014, the county health center launched the public health initiative How High Ventura County. It is the largest teen marijuana education platform in California, launched in order to educate parents about the harm that consuming marijuana causes to the adolescent brain.

The county board of supervisors formed the Ventura County Health Care System Oversight Committee in 2022 to ensure the county medical system follows rules for billing federal health care programs.

See also
Santa Paula Hospital

References

External links 
Ventura County Medical Center Official Website
This hospital in the CA Healthcare Atlas A project by OSHPD
 Ventura County Medical Center Patient Information Booklet

Hospitals in Ventura County, California
County hospitals in California
Buildings and structures in Ventura, California
Organizations based in Ventura County, California
Trauma centers